Gabriel Okolosi (born 8 July 1974) is a Nigerian former footballer who played in the 1990s. He played mainly in the position as striker, but also as midfielder.

Football career
Born in Nigeria Okolosi played for Julius Berger F.C and transferred to the Côte d'Ivoire and joined Africa Sports National. He was part of the team that won the Côte d'Ivoire Cup in 1993. He played for Africa Sports for four years before moving to Switzerland.

Okolosi joined FC Basel's first team for their 1995–96 season under head coach Claude Andrey. After playing in one test match Okolosi made his domestic league debut for the club in the home game in the St. Jakob Stadium on 19 July 1995 as Basel won 2–1 against Sion. Okolosi scored his first goal for his club in the home game on 2 August. In fact he scored two goals as Basel won 2–0 against Luzern. Altogether he netted four times, but two of the goals were canceled due to the off-side rule. Head coach used Okolosi in the starting team, often substituting him out. At the end of October Andrey lost his job and was replaced by Karl Engel who changed the team and put Okolosi on the substitutes bench.

This was not to the liking of Okolosi and at the end of the season he moved on. During his time with the club, he played a total of 39 games for Basel scoring a total of five goals. 25 of these games were in the Nationalliga A, four in the Swiss Cup and 10 were friendly games. In all he was substituted out on 13 occasions and in on 19 occasions. He scored two goals in the domestic league, two in the cup and the other was scored during the test games.

In the 1996 offseason Okolosi transferred to BSC Young Boys, but did not get as much playing time as with his former club, so the following summer he moved on again. He played for SV Waldhof Mannheim, where he played the first part on the 1997–98 Regionalliga season. The second half of the season he played for FC Baden in the second tier of Swiss football.

Following these three years in Europe Okolosi moved to Tunisia and joined Espérance Sportive, where he stayed for one season. Then he went on to play for Al-Ahli SC in Libya.

References

Sources
 
 
 Die ersten 125 Jahre. Publisher: Josef Zindel im Friedrich Reinhardt Verlag, Basel. 
 Verein "Basler Fussballarchiv" Homepage

1974 births
Living people
Nigerian footballers
Nigeria international footballers
Association football forwards
Africa Sports d'Abidjan players
FC Basel players
BSC Young Boys players
SV Waldhof Mannheim players
FC Baden players
Espérance Sportive de Tunis players
Al-Ahli SC (Tripoli) players
Swiss Super League players
Swiss Challenge League players
Nigerian expatriate footballers
Nigerian expatriate sportspeople in Ivory Coast
Nigerian expatriate sportspeople in Switzerland
Nigerian expatriate sportspeople in Germany
Nigerian expatriate sportspeople in Tunisia
Nigerian expatriate sportspeople in Libya
Expatriate footballers in Ivory Coast
Expatriate footballers in Switzerland
Expatriate footballers in Germany
Expatriate footballers in Tunisia
Expatriate footballers in Libya
Bridge F.C. players
Nigeria Professional Football League players
Ligue 1 (Ivory Coast) players
Regionalliga players
Tunisian Ligue Professionnelle 1 players
Libyan Premier League players